Hourieh Peramaa A.K.A Hourieh Peramam A.K.A Horelma is a Kazakh-born billionaire property investor.

Early life 

Peramaa was born in August 1930. Her family were forced to seek refuge in Iran when the Kulaks were subject of repression and execution by the USSR government.

Wealth 
In 2008, it was reported that her investment portfolio of commercial real estate was worth more than £1 billion spanning across Europe and North America. In the same year, she again made headlines by purchasing the most expensive new built house in London.

Personal life 
Peramaa, once a penniless refugee, fled her native Kazakhstan aged 17 and was forced to live in an Iranian refugee camp. There she met her future husband, a medical student from a wealthy Iranian family.

The reclusive billionaire is known for her affinity for fine wines and thoroughbred horses. She divides her time between her estates in North America, Europe and Morocco. She has 5 daughters and 1 son.

Panama Papers 
In 2015, her name was mentioned in the leaked Panama Papers connecting her to Tiquen Investments, a conglomerate investment holding incorporated in 2003.

References

1930 births
Living people
Kazakhstani billionaires
Iranian billionaires
Kazakhstani people of Iranian descent